The Plaid Army is a group of Canadian internet live streamers know for trolling and far right politics. The group has been accused by the Canadian Anti-Hate Network of islamophobia and anti-semitism.

Activities and views 
The Plaid Army is a group of far right internet trolls. The Canadian Anti-Hate Network describe the group as racist and antisemitic.

Membership and associations 
The Ontario Provincial Police reported connections between the Plaid Army and the "Patriot Movement" who are known for their "opposition of provincial and federal government responses to the COVID-19 public health crisis.” The group is also associated with the far-right protest group Diagalon. People connected to both groups were present at the Canada convoy protests.

Members include right-wing video bloggers Jeremy MacKenzie and Derek Harrison. Harrison wanted the convoy protests to turn violent, akin to the January 6 United States Capitol attack. MacKenzie oversees the group.

See also 

 COVID-19 protests in Canada

References 

Far-right politics in Canada
Internet trolls
Antisemitism in Canada
Islamophobia in Canada
Canada convoy protest